Al-Hamdaniya District (also known as Bakhdida District;) is a district in the north-east of the Nineveh Governorate (Ninawa) of Iraq.

Al-Hamdaniya District is divided between four sub-districts:
 Aski Kalak (Khabat) Sub-District, mostly Kurdish, some Assyrians and Yazidis, (de facto or even unofficial part of Aqrah district).
 al-Namrud (al-Khidhr) Sub-District, mostly Arab and Turkmen, some Kaka'is, Shabak and Assyrian,
 Bartillah (Baritleh) Sub-District, mostly Assyrian, some Shabak, Arab and Turkmen,
 Qaraqosh (Bakhdida) Sub-District, mostly Assyrians, some Arabs, Shabak, Turkmen and Kaka'is.

Towns and villages include: 
Bashiqa
Bahzani
Bakhdida
Bartella
Karemlash
Balawat

See also

 Assyrian homeland
 Proposals for Assyrian autonomy in Iraq
 Assyrian settlements

References

Districts of Nineveh Governorate